Broken Rainbow is a 1985 American documentary film by  Victoria Mudd and Maria Florio.

Summary
The film is about the history of Navajo Native Americans, focusing on the government enforced relocation of thousands  from Black Mesa in Arizona after the 1974 Navajo-Hopi Land Settlement Act. According to the film, the Navajo were relocated to aid mining speculation in a process that began in 1964. The film is narrated by Martin Sheen. The title song was written by Laura Nyro, the theme music was composed by Paul Apodaca, with other original music by Rick Krizman and Fred Myrow.

Accolades
It won the Academy Award for Best Documentary Feature at the 58th Academy Awards.

See also
 Black Mesa Peabody Coal controversy
 Wounded Knee incident
 American Indian Movement

References

External links
 
 
 Broken Rainbow at Earthworks Films
 The entire film on YouTube
 New York Times review of the film

1985 films
Navajo-language films
American documentary films
Best Documentary Feature Academy Award winners
Documentary films about Arizona
Documentary films about indigenous rights
Documentary films about United States history
1985 documentary films
Documentary films about mining
Documentary films about Native Americans
Films set in Arizona
Films set on the Navajo Nation
1980s English-language films
1980s American films
1985 multilingual films
American multilingual films